Cholangitis is any inflammation of the biliary tree, including:
Ascending cholangitis, a severe acute bacterial infection associated with gallstones in the common bile duct
Primary sclerosing cholangitis, a chronic autoimmune disease leading to liver failure
Secondary sclerosing cholangitis, an umbrella term for other unrelated medical conditions that cause sclerosis of the bile ducts